Vleteren is a municipality located in the Belgian province of West Flanders. The municipality comprises the towns of Oostvleteren, Westvleteren and Woesten. On January 1, 2006, Vleteren had a total population of 3,636. The total area is 38.15 km2 which gives a population density of 95 inhabitants per km2.

References

External links 

Municipalities of West Flanders